The Morazanist Patriotic Front (FPM, Spanish: Frente Patriótico Morazanista; sometimes spelt Morzanist) is a paramilitary group operating in Honduras. It has the aim of limiting United States involvement in Honduras, possibly with links to former Nicaraguan government officials. Although linked with the Communist Party of Honduras, it has not set out any Marxist aims. It is often considered a terrorist organisation by external observers. In 1988, it claimed responsibility for bombing the Peace Corps; this was followed by two bus bombings in 1989 and 1990, and a grenade attack wounding seven US soldiers. 

It was one of few paramilitary groups not to lay down their arms after the US-backed Contras, no longer fighting against Daniel Ortega's government, having replaced Sandinista's Junta of National Reconstruction  in Nicaragua, left Honduras. FPM's last attack was in April 1995, when a leaflet bomb exploded close to the offices of several foreign press agencies, with no injuries. The group is not longer considered active.

References

Communism in Honduras
Guerrilla movements in Latin America
Political history of Honduras